Jason Isbell and The 400 Unit is Jason Isbell's second full-length album, and first album released with The 400 Unit as accompanying band.  The deluxe version of the album contains an additional four tracks.  On October 18, 2019, the album was re-released with remixing done by Dave Cobb and remastering done by Pete Lyman.

Track listing

Track listing (Reissue)

Personnel
Jason Isbell - guitars and vocals
Browan Lollar - guitars
Derry deBorja - keyboards
Jimbo Hart - bass guitar
Matt Pence - drums
Charles Rose - horn arrangements on "No Choice In The Matter"
Charles Rose, Harvey Thompson, and Vinny Ciesielski - horns on "No Choice In The Matter"
 *Track appears on the deluxe version of the album

Cover art
Browan Lollar

References

2009 albums
Jason Isbell albums
Lightning Rod Records albums